The 28th Chicago Film Critics Association Awards were announced on December 16, 2015. The awards honor the best in film for 2015. The nominations were announced on December 14. Mad Max: Fury Road received the most nominations (7), followed by Carol (6) and The Revenant (5).

Winners and nominees

The winners and nominees for the 28th Chicago Film Critics Association Awards are as follows:

Awards

Awards breakdown
The following films received multiple nominations:

The following films received multiple wins:

References

External links
 

 2015
2015 film awards